Wird is a regular litany and invocation in Sufism.

Wird may also refer to:
 Wird lazim, a regular litany in Tijaniyya Sufi order. 
 WIRD, a defunct radio station in Lake Placid, New York.